The Ely LDS Stake Tabernacle was built by the Church of Jesus Christ of Latter-day Saints (LDS Church) in 1927-1928 as a church and community center in Ely, Nevada. The two-story Colonial Revival building is now owned by White Pine County and is used as a community meeting hall. The contractor for the project was Joseph Don Carlos Young, grandson of Brigham Young.

The stake tabernacle is an unusual example of Colonial Revival design in Nevada, where the style was never widely used. It is also notable as an early example of the expansion of the LDS Church into neighboring states. The LDS church first was established in Ely in 1915. In 1926 the Ely Ward was established. The tabernacle was completed in 1928, containing a 600-seat auditorium, meeting space and classrooms. The facility was replaced by a new meetinghouse in 1957.

References

Buildings and structures in White Pine County, Nevada
Ely, Nevada
Former churches in Nevada
Former Latter Day Saint religious buildings and structures
The Church of Jesus Christ of Latter-day Saints in Nevada
Churches on the National Register of Historic Places in Nevada
Churches completed in 1927
20th-century Latter Day Saint church buildings
Tabernacles (LDS Church)
Colonial Revival architecture in Nevada
National Register of Historic Places in White Pine County, Nevada